Bali (also known as Bibaali, Maya, Abaali, Ibaale, or Ibaali) is a Niger–Congo language spoken by 100,000 people in Demsa, Adamawa, Nigeria.

References

Languages of Nigeria
Mumuye–Yendang languages